The Webb Ellis Rugby Football Museum is a rugby football museum in the town centre of Rugby in Warwickshire, England, near Rugby School. It takes its name from William Webb Ellis who is credited with inventing the game of Rugby football.

The museum,  (previously known as the James Gilbert Rugby Football Museum) opened in the 1980, and is housed in the building where the shoe and boot maker James Gilbert, (nephew of William Gilbert), first made rugby balls in 1842.  On its premises (see image) it is identified as The Rugby Museum.

The museum is packed with much rugby memorabilia, including a Gilbert football of the kind used at Rugby School that was exhibited at the first World's Fair, at the Great Exhibition in London and the original Richard Lindon (inventor of the rubber bladder for rugby balls) brass hand pump. Traditional handmade rugby balls are still made at the museum.

See also
 Rugby Museum (disambiguation page)

References

External links
Webb Ellis Rugby Football Museum on Rugby Borough Council site

History of rugby union
Museums in Warwickshire
History of rugby union in England
Rugby union in Warwickshire
Sports museums in the United Kingdom
Buildings and structures in Rugby, Warwickshire